The 2017 Karuizawa International Curling Championships were held from December 14 to 17 at the Karuizawa Ice Park in Karuizawa, Japan. It is part of the 2017-18 World Curling Tour.

Men

Teams
The teams are listed as follows:

Round-robin standings

Playoffs

Women

Teams
The teams are listed as follows:

Round-robin standings

Round-robin results
All draw times listed in Japan Standard Time (UTC+9).

Playoffs

References

External links

Karuizawa International Curling Championship
Karuizawa International Curling Championship
Sport in Nagano Prefecture
Curling
Curling competitions in Japan
Karuizawa International Curling Championship